Marek Hovorka (born 24 October 1991) is a professional Czech football player who currently plays for FK Ústí nad Labem. He has represented his country at youth level.

References

External links
 

1991 births
Living people
Czech footballers
Czech First League players
FK Jablonec players
FK Ústí nad Labem players

Association football midfielders